Zakaria Chilongoshi (born 27 October 1999) is a Zambian footballer who plays as a left back for Power Dynamos and the Zambia national football team.

Career
Chilongoshi was born in Lusaka.

After playing for Prison Leopards and Kabwe Warriors, Chilongoshi signed for Power Dynamos on a three-year contract with the option of a year-long extension in September 2020.

References

External links

1999 births
Living people
Zambian footballers
Sportspeople from Lusaka
Association football fullbacks
Kabwe Warriors F.C. players
Power Dynamos F.C. players
Zambia international footballers
Zambia Super League players
Zambia A' international footballers
2020 African Nations Championship players